Lehre is a municipality in the district of Helmstedt, in Lower Saxony, Germany.

The municipality received the name of Lehre on June 10, 888 and is made up of eight surrounding villages. They are Beienrode, Essehof, Essenrode, Flechtorf, Groß Brunsrode, Klein Brunsrode, Lehre, and Wendhausen with Lehre being the largest.

History

The Institute produced ammunition for infantry weapons, anti-tank mines, tank shells, artillery guns and .38 cm. Up until February 1945, 6,000 tons of chemical weapons were transported to the Institute. It was not bombed during World War II and up until the end war, most of these weapons remained on site. In 1945, the location also housed Russian prisoners of war. On 11 April 1945, the area was liberated by the United States' 5th Armored Division and the Army Ammunition Institute was occupied without a fight. In mid 1945, the area was handed over to British troops who had a local presence until 1951. Today, many original buildings still remain standing and some are still in use.

Transportation

Road
Lehre is located on State Road (Landesstraße) L295 which provides access to freeways A2 and A39.

Train
Lehre rail service began when the Brunswick State Railway Company completed the Schunter Valley Railway in 1904, connecting Braunschweig with Fallersleben. This line officially ceased operation in 1998 following the opening of the Weddel loop which connected Wolfsburg and Braunschweig, bypassing Lehre.

Nearby Attractions

 Campen Castle - A partially standing castle built in the late 13th century.
 Essehof Zoo
 Essenrode Manor - A late Baroque-style manor built in 1738
 Holy Cross Church - A historic 13th century church located in Lehre
 Wendhausen Castle - A moated 17th century residence.  It has an inner courtyard and Baroque-style garden with ivy covering its walls.
 Wendhausen Windmill - A large five-sail Dutch-style windmill

Notable people

 Karl August von Hardenberg (1750–1822) - Former Prime Minister of Prussia
 Hans, Count von Bülow (1774-1825) - Former Prussian politician
 Eberhard Haun (1949-1976) - Professional soccer player
 August Hermann (1835–1906) - Sports educator who helped create school sports in Germany

References

External links
 Essehof Zoo

888 establishments
Helmstedt (district)
9th-century establishments in Germany